The New Politics of Science is a 1984 book by David Dickson. The book is about the political relationships which affect science funding. Dickson argues that decisions about science are becoming concentrated in a closed circle of corporate, banking, and military leaders and that America's scientific enterprise is being steadily removed from public decision-making.

Dickson was Washington correspondent for the British weekly journal Nature and European correspondent for the journal Science.

See also
List of books about the politics of science

References

External links
The Politics of Science

Books about the politics of science
1984 non-fiction books